Aqme (stylized as AqME, previously known as Neurosyndrom) was a French rock band originating from Paris, France, consisting of four members. The band was part of a French nu metal movement called "Team Nowhere", but they eventually split up with the Team in order to have more independence.

Biography

Beginning and University of Nowhere (1999–2001)
Aqme was created in the end of 1999 after the break-up of Neurosyndrom, which were one of the founding bands of the music collective Team Nowhere. The band name is inspired from the Ancient Greek word "akmê" meaning the climax or turning point of something. At the time of its formation, Aqme's line-up was composed of ETN (Étienne) on drums, Ben (Benjamin) on guitar, Sofy (Sophie) on bass (who will later be replaced by Charlotte), and Koma (Thomas) on vocals. Six months after the formation of the band, the quartet released a five track demo known as "University Of Nowhere". It is at this period, when the band started appearing in several compilations, that Sofy left the band. She was then replaced by Charlotte. They reissue 2000 copies of University of Nowhere in April 2001.

Sombres efforts and Polaroïds and Pornographie (2001–2004)

Not very satisfied of their previous releases, the band decided to work in studio during a year in order to create their first album. They went to record in Sweden with the Swedish producer Daniel Bergstrand, who is known for working with Meshuggah, In Flames, and Misery Loves Co. The band then came back to France and played in concerts with other French bands such as Unfold and Mass Hysteria. The band's new songs attracted more people to the concerts and the band eventually had a larger audience.

Aqme's critical acclaim occurred after the release of their first album, Sombre Efforts (French for "Dark Efforts"). They went on a relatively big tour across France between September 2002 and October 2003, with a notable success at the Eurockéennes de Belfort. At the end of 2003, the Parisian band went back to studio recording in order to make their second album, Polaroïds & Pornographie (French for "Polaroids & Pornography"). AqME publicly announces his departure from the Team Nowhere on 2004, 12 September.

La Fin des Temps and Live(s) (2005–2006)
The band began recording their third album, this time without Daniel Bergstrand, after a lengthy tour. They chose Steve Prestage as a producer and stayed in Paris for recording. The album was released in October 2005, under the name La Fin des Temps (French for "The End of Times"), and Pas assez loin was even played on the radio. This third album had more prominent guitar parts but still continued to be playable live. The lyrics centered around different topics such as euthanasia (Ainsi soit-il), apprehension of death (La Belle Inconnue), the downfall of the world (La Fin des Temps), and human relationships. Aqme has opened the concerts for Indochine during their tour since AqME had recorded a track with Indochine (Aujourd'hui je pleure), which is featured on Indochine's album Alice & June.

The band also releases his first Live DVD titled Live(s), recorded 2 June 2006 on Nantes.

On 21 October 2006, following a concert at the Olympia, the band announced that they were planning on disappearing the following year in order to come back with a fourth album in 2008.

Break (2006–2007)
Three out of the four members have now a side-project. On 26 November 2006, Étienne's side-project, "Grymt", released its first record called "My Dark One". In June 2007, Thomas and Ben have announced via MySpace that they're both working on their new bands ("Vicky Vale" and "Die on Monday") debut album.

The band lists Nirvana, Soundgarden, Cold, Chokebore, Deftones, Korn as their primary influences.

Hérésie and En l'honneur de Jupiter (2007–2010) 

Their fourth studio album, entitled Hérésie (French for "Heresy"), was released on 4 February 2008.

After ten years of music with his mates, Ben left AqME in November 2008 in order to work entirely on his own group, Die on Monday. Next to latent period, the band integrates Mulder (Julien Hekking) as guitarist in January 2009, this one and ETN both performed within the band Grymt. This new quartet records a fifth album, En l'honneur de Jupiter (French for "In Honour of Jupiter") which is released on 19 October 2009.

Épithète, Dominion, Épitaphe and Les Sentiers de l'aube (2011–2013)
Their sixth album Épithète, Dominion, Épitaphe (French for "Epithet, Dominion, Epitaph") release 10 April 2012 as Thomas Thirrion (Koma)'s swan song: Indeed, the singer has announced, to the surprise of the others AqME members, his complete withdrawal from the music world in March 2012. Vincent Peignart-Mancini take his place during the tour following album release.

With this new singer, AqME releases an EP titled Les Sentiers de l'aube (French for "The Paths of Dawn") 15 October 2012, gathering 3 unreleased tracks and 3 live tracks from the previous albums.

Dévisager Dieu (2014-2017)
3 November 2014, AqME delivers his seventh album Dévisager Dieu (French for "To stare at God"): upstream from that release, the clip of Avant le Jour comes ahead. The band returns on the road at the ending of November 2014 to defend that new album. Charlotte takes a hiatus towards the band for the time to achieve her pregnancy. The bass will be taken during the rest of the tour by Vincent's twin brother, Julien Peignart-Mancini.

AqME (since 2017)
To celebrate the 15 years of the first album Sombres efforts, AqME reissues it 21 April 2017 on a CD version (consist of 2 discs, one for the album remastered by Magnus Lindberg and the second containing demo versions as well as an unreleased recorded at that same era) and a LP version on the occasion of the Record Store Day, 22 April.

17 May 2017, the band shows the clip for Tant d'années, one amongst the tracks from the next album expected for the upcoming back-to-school season. The new album is announced 22 September 2017 with the eponymous title AqME.

Requiem: split up and farewell tour (2019)
11 November 2018, AqME announces on the social medias, by a long communiqué, that the 2019 year will be the last for the group, which get ready to celebrate its twentieth anniversary, explaining be gotten to the end of a human and art adventure. 12 April 2019, they release their ninth album, Requiem. They split up after a ten-dates farewell tour, passing across France and Belgium, from March 2019 to January 2020, playing their last concert 11 January 2020 at the Trianon in Paris, two former historic members within : Thomas Thirrion (Koma) on vocals et Benjamin Rubin (Ben) on guitar. However, the last dates are cancelled because of last line-up singer Vinc's health issues.

Line up 

Current members
 Étienne Sarthou / "ETN" — drums (since 1999)
 Charlotte Poiget / "Charlotte" — bass (since 2000)
 Julien Hekking / "Mulder" — guitars (since 2009)
 Vincent Peignart-Mancini / "Vinc" — vocals (since 2012)

Former members
 Thomas Thirrion / "Koma" — vocals (1999–2012)
 Benjamin Rubin / "Ben" — guitars (1999–2008)
 Sophie Chaussade / "Sofy" — bass (1999–2000)

Touring musicians
 Julien Peignart-Mancini – bass (2015)

Timeline

Discography

Studio albums
Sombres efforts (2002) Superstar
 « Si » n'existe pas ("‘If‘ doesn't exist")
 Le Rouge et le Noir ("The Red and the Black")
 Tout à un détail près ("All except for one detail")
 Instable ("Unstable")
 Une autre ligne ("Another line")
 Je suis ("I am")
 Fin ("End")
 Sainte ("Holy")
 In Memoriam (Latin for "Into memory")
 Délicate & saine ("Delicate & healthy"; word play with "Delicatessen")Polaroïds & Pornographie (Original Edition / Limited Edition) (2004) Pornographie ("Pornography")
 À chaque seconde ("Every second")
 3'38
 Tes mots me manquent ("I miss your words" / "Your words fail me")
 La Théorie du poisson rouge ("The goldfish theory")
 Sur le fil ("On the edge" / "By a thread")
 Vampire
 Comprendre ("Understand")
 Être & ne pas être ("To be & not to be")
 Ce que tu es ("What you are")
 La vie est belle ("Life is beautiful")
 La réponse ("The answer")CD2 (Limited Edition) Automédication ("Self-medication")
 Le rouge & le noir (live) ⑵
 Tout à un détail près (live) ⑵
 Je suis (live) ⑵
 Fin (live) ⑵
 " Si " n'existe pas (live) ⑵
⑴ Presented as such on the album back cover.⑵ Track recorded at the Eurockéennes de Belfort on July 2003.La Fin des Temps (Original Edition / CD+DVD Edition) (2005) Ténèbres ("Darkness")
 Des illusions ("Some illusions"; word play with French for "Disillusion/Disillusionment")
 La fin des temps ("The End of Time")
 Une vie pour rien ("A life for nothing")
 Ainsi soit-il ("Thus be it")
 Une dernière fois ("One last time")
 Pas assez loin ("Not far enough")
 Rien au monde ("Nothing in the world")
 Le Poids des mots ("The weight of words")
 La Belle Inconnue ("The Beautiful Unknown/Stranger")DVD (CD+DVD Edition)Making OfHérésie (Original Edition / Limited Edition) (2008) Hérésie ("Heresy")
 Uniformes ("Uniforms"—same ‘unvarying, conform/outfit’ double meaning)
 Lourd sacrifice ("Heavy sacrifice")
 Un goût amer ("A bitter taste")
 Karma & nicotine
 Les enfers ("The underworld")
 En saga om livet (Swedish for "A story about life")
 Romance mathématique ("Mathematical romance")
 Casser/détruire ("Break/destroy")
 312
 A.M.: un jour de pluie ("A.M.—Automutilation, French for ‘self-harm’—: a rainy day")
 Triskaïdékaphobie ("Triskaidekaphobia")
 Utilisation de la synthèse additive ⑴ ("Additive color use")
⑴ Track included in the Limited Edition of the album.En l'honneur de Jupiter (Original Edition / Limited Edition) (2009) Tout le monde est malheureux ("Everyone is unhappy")
 Guillotine
 Les matamores ("The braggarts")
 Noël Noir ("Black Christmas")
 Macabre moderne ("Modern macabre")
 Le culte du rien ("The cult of the nothingness")
 Blasphème ("Blasphemy")
 Stadium Complex
 Question de violence ("Question of violence")
 Vivre à nouveau ("Live once again")
 Le chaos ("The chaos")
 Uppe på berget (Swedish for "On the mountain")DVD (Limited Edition) Making of
 Video teaser
 Photo galleryÉpithète, Dominion, Épitaphe (Original Edition / Limited Edition) (2012) Idiologie ("Idiology"; portmanteau with "Idiot" and "Ideology")
 Quel que soit le Prométhéen (ou le Nihiliste) ("Whatever the Promethean (or the Nihilist) is")
 Épithète, Dominion, Épitaphe ("Epithet, Dominion, Epitaph")
 Luxe assassin ("Deadly luxury")
 L'empire des jours semblables ("The empire of the indistinguishable days")
 Adieu ! ("Farewell!")
 My English Is Pretty Bad
 Marketing Armageddon
 Plus tard vs trop tard ("Later vs. too late")
 La dialectique des possédés ("The dialectic of possessed")
 110.587CD2 – Les Sentiers de l'Aube (EP) (Limited Edition)Dévisager Dieu (2014) Avant le jour ("Before the day") (Video: https://www.youtube.com/watch?v=cjaQPArjdAE)
 Enfants de Dieu ("Children of God")
 Au-delà de l'ombre ("Beyond the shadow")
 Ce que nous sommes ("What we are")
 Un appel ("A call")
 Entre louanges et regrets ("Between praises and regrets")
 L'homme et le sablier ("The man and the hourglass")
 Pour le meilleur, le pire ("For the best, the worst"; word play with "For better, for worse")
 Les abysses ("The abysses")AqME (2017) Ensemble ("Together")
 Tant d'années ("So many years")
 Refuser le silence ("Refuse the silence")
 Enfant du ciel ("Child of the sky")
 Rien ne nous arrêtera ("Nothing will stop us") (featuring Reuno)
 Si loin ("So far away")
 Tout est supplice ("Everything is torture")
 Un damné ("A damned")
 Meurs ! ("Die!")
 Une promesse ("A promise")
 Se souvenir ("Remember")
 M.E.S.S.Requiem (2019) Entre les mains ("Between/In the hands")
 Enfer ("Hell")
 Un adieu ("A farewell/goodbye")
 Illusion
 Paradis ("Paradise")
 Sous d'autres cieux ("Under other skies / In other climes")
 Requiem
 Un autre signe ("Another sign")
 Sans oublier ("Without forget[ting]")

EPs
As NeurosyndromConfusionmentale (1998) Miss
 Schizoïdes ("Schizoids")
 Bleu ("Blue")
 Candelia
 26 

As AqMEUniversity of Nowhere (1999) Encore une fois ("Once again")
 T.N.
 À jamais ("Forever")
 Words
 Beauté vénéneuse ("Poisonous beauty")AqME (2004) Chaque seconde ⑴
 Pornographie
 Ce que tu es
⑴ Presented as such on the album back cover.Les Sentiers de l'Aube (2012) ⑴
 Tout s'effondre ("Everything collapses")
 Fils ingrat ("Ungrateful son")
 Autolyse ("Autolysis")
 Idiologie (live)
 Pornographie (live)
 Luxe assassin (live)
⑴ Included as second part of the Épithète, Dominion, Épitaphe studio album Limited Edition.

Demos
As NeurosyndromSlimfast (1997) Green Ticket
 N°26
 Don't Marry Me

ReissuesUniversity of Nowhere (Limited Edition) (2000) Encore une fois
 T.N.
 À jamais
 Words
 Beauté vénéneuse
 Sainte ⑴
 Bulmas ⑴
 Mis à quia ⑴ (synonym of "Silenced")
⑴ Bonus track unreleased in the first edition.Sombres efforts ("15th Anniversary" Remastered 2-Disc Deluxe Edition) (2017)CD1 – Album studio remasterisé
 Superstar
 " Si " n'existe pas
 Le Rouge et le Noir
 Tout à un détail près
 Instable
 Une autre ligne
 Je suis
 Fin
 Sainte
 In Memoriam
 Délicate & saine

CD2 – Raretés
 Maquettes SE#1
 " Si " n'existe pas (Demo version)
 Délicate et saine (Demo version)
 Instable (Demo version)
 Une autre ligne (Demo version)
 Maquettes SE#2
 Superstar (Demo version)
 Le Rouge et le Noir (Demo version)
 In Memoriam (Demo version)
 Je suis (Demo version)
 Inédits
 Sombres efforts ("Dark efforts") (Demo version)
 TNT (Instrumental demo version)
 Version inédite
 Tout à un détail près (Demo version)

Live recordings
Live(s) (2006)
 Ténèbres
 Des illusions
 Être & ne pas être
 Ce que tu es
 Le Rouge & le Noir
 À chaque seconde
 Pornographie
 3'38
 Tout à un détail près
 La Belle Inconnue
 Pas assez loin
 La réponse
 Ainsi soit-il
 Superstar
 Le poids des mots
 "Si" n'existe pas

References

Sources 
 AqME's official MySpace
 Official website (French)
 "Poussée d'AqME" (French)
 Pictures of AqME during a concert for fundraising concerning AIDS (French)

Alternative metal musical groups
Musical groups established in 1999
French nu metal musical groups
Musical quartets
1999 establishments in France
Musical groups from Paris